Hereditary is a 2018 American psychological horror film written and directed by Ari Aster in his feature directorial debut. It stars Toni Collette, Alex Wolff, Milly Shapiro and Gabriel Byrne as the members of a family haunted by a mysterious presence after the death of their secretive grandmother.

Aster's short film work attracted the attention of A24, who greenlit Hereditary as his first feature film. Aster conceived it as primarily a family drama consisting of two distinct halves. Filming took place in Utah in 2017, with most indoor scenes shot on custom built sets on a soundstage to give the film a dollhouse aesthetic.

Hereditary premiered at the Sundance Film Festival on January 21, 2018, and was theatrically released in the United States on June 8, 2018. The film received widespread critical acclaim, with particular praise for Collette's performance as well as the rest of the cast, musical score, visual style and Aster's direction. It made over $82 million on a $10 million budget to become A24's highest-grossing film worldwide at the time, up until the release of the 2022 film Everything Everywhere All at Once which became A24's first film to cross the $100 million as its highest-grossing film.

Plot
Miniature artist Annie Graham lives with her psychiatrist husband Steve, their 16-year-old son Peter, and their 13-year-old daughter Charlie. The family attends the funeral of Annie's emotionally distant mother, Ellen. Annie is surprised at the number of people in attendance. Annie attends a bereavement support group, revealing she and her mother had a fraught relationship until Charlie was born when Ellen became a significant figure in raising her. Meanwhile, Steve receives a phone call telling him that unknown perpetrators desecrated Ellen's grave, but does not reveal this to Annie.

Peter is invited to a party, and Annie insists that Charlie go with him. On the way to the party, the siblings pass a telephone pole carved with an occult sigil. At the party, Peter leaves Charlie by herself, and Charlie, who has a severe nut allergy, eats chocolate cake that had been cut with a knife that was used to chop walnuts and goes into anaphylactic shock. As Peter drives Charlie to the hospital, she leans out of the window for air; when Peter swerves to avoid a dead deer lying in the road, she is decapitated by the sigil telephone pole. In shock, Peter drives home and leaves Charlie's decapitated body in the back seat of his car, which Annie discovers to her horror the following morning.

Annie befriends support group member Joan. Joan teaches Annie to perform a séance to commune with Charlie. Later that night, Annie convinces her family to attempt the séance. Objects begin to move and smash, and Peter is petrified when Annie speaks in Charlie's voice until Steve throws water on her. As Peter begins to be plagued by supernatural entities, Annie suspects Charlie's spirit has become vengeful and demonic. When she sees images in Charlie's sketchbook threatening Peter, she throws the book into the fireplace. However, her clothing goes up in flames alongside the book and only stops when she pulls it away from the flames. 

Annie goes through her mother's old belongings, and finds a photo album that shows Ellen to have been Queen Leigh, the leader of a coven, and Joan one of her followers. Another book describes the demon King  Paimon, who wishes to inhabit the body of a male host. The summoner of Paimon will receive wealth and rewards. In the attic, Annie finds Ellen's body and occultist symbols.

While Peter is outside his school, Joan appears and attempts to expel his spirit from his body for the demon king. In class, Peter is taken over by an unseen force and slams his head against his desk. Annie informs Steve of her ties to the book and begs him to burn it, as she can't bring herself to commit suicide. When he refuses, she flings the book into the fire, only for Steve to burst into flames. Annie reacts in horror, but then her expression turns blank as Paimon possesses her. 

As naked coven members begin gathering both inside and around the house, Peter wakes after dark and finds his father's burned corpse, then quickly notices one of the coven members in a nearby doorway. A now possessed Annie then chases him through the house. Attempting to hide in the attic, Peter witnesses Annie decapitating herself with a piece of piano wire and jumps from the attic window, presumably to his death. A glowing orb enters and reanimates his body. He follows Annie's floating headless body into Charlie's treehouse, where Joan and other members of the coven, as well as Ellen and Annie's headless bodies, are bowing to an idol made with Charlie's severed head. Joan places a crown on Peter's head. She proclaims that they have replaced Charlie with a correct male host, and the coven hail Peter as King Paimon.

Cast 
 Toni Collette as Annie Graham, a miniatures artist
 Gabriel Byrne as Steve Graham, a psychiatrist and Annie's husband
 Alex Wolff as Peter Graham, Annie and Steve's 16-year-old son
 Milly Shapiro as Charlie Graham, Annie and Steve's 13-year-old daughter
 Ann Dowd as Joan, a support group member who befriends Annie
 Mallory Bechtel as Bridget, Peter's schoolmate and love interest

Ari Aster has an uncredited voice cameo as Annie's art dealer, who calls to offer support after the tragedy she has been experiencing. Kathleen Chalfant makes an uncredited appearance as Ellen Taper Leigh, Annie's mother. Aster refers to her as "the sweetest person in the world".

Production

Development 
Writer-director Ari Aster embarked on a career in the film industry while a student at the American Film Institute; he scripted and directed two provocative short films, The Strange Thing About the Johnsons and Munchausen, bringing him under the scope of A24. Aster originally pitched Hereditary as a family tragedy, careful not to call it a horror film outright. A fan of domestic dramas, Aster incorporated themes of the genre into his script, envisioning a film rooted in family dynamics, trauma, and grief; Carrie and The Cook, the Thief, His Wife and Her Lover were works Aster specified as influences on Hereditary. He interpreted the film as two halves which are "completely inextricable from each other": "It begins as a family tragedy and then continues down that path, but gradually curdles into a full-bore nightmare."

The script resembles a real-life incident from 2004 in Marietta, Georgia, in which John Kemper Hutcherson accidentally decapitated his childhood friend and passenger, Frankie Brohm, on a telephone pole support wire, after the latter had leaned his head from the vehicle to relieve the symptoms of his inebriation. Hutcherson then drove home with Brohm's headless corpse in the car and fell asleep, until a passerby, walking with his toddler, noticed Brohm's body still in the truck the next morning and notified authorities. Aster has never commented on this.

Casting 
Toni Collette was one of the first actresses Aster sought for the role of Annie Graham, a miniaturist and the matriarch of the Graham family. Though Collette was reluctant to work on a horror film, the script's grounded approach to the genre convinced her to commit to the project: "He [Aster] just really understood the dynamics in the family, has such an understanding of what it is to be human, what it is to experience loss".

Gabriel Byrne agreed to play the family's patriarch Steve; Alex Wolff, who previously collaborated with Byrne in the HBO program In Treatment was cast as the Grahams' son Peter. Cast in her cinema debut, 14-year-old Broadway theatre actress Milly Shapiro, winner of a Tony Honor for her performance in Matilda the Musical, earned the role of the daughter Charlie. After watching Shapiro's audition, Aster was immediately relieved "'cause I knew the chances were slim that I would find somebody who would be right", having left Charlie's personality more ambiguous than other characters in the script. Ann Dowd portrays grieving mother Joan, who convinces Annie of her ability to contact the dead.

Filming 

The film began shooting in February 2017 in Utah. The exteriors of the Graham family house and the tree house were shot in Summit County, Utah, and the cemetery scene was filmed at Larkin Sunset Gardens in Sandy, Utah. The school scenes were shot at West High School and Utah State Fairpark, but all other interiors (including both versions of the treehouse) were built from scratch on a sound stage. Since each of the rooms was built on a stage, walls could be removed to shoot scenes at a much greater distance than a practical location would allow, creating the dollhouse aesthetic of the film.

Aster said that during filming, "Alex Wolff told me not to say the name of William Shakespeare's Scottish play out loud because of some superstitious theater legend. I smugly announced the name, and then one of our lights burst during the shooting of the following scene."

Release

Hereditary premiered at the Sundance Film Festival on January 21, 2018. The trailer for the film was released on January 30, 2018. On Anzac Day in 2018, the trailer for Hereditary played before the PG-rated family film Peter Rabbit in a cinema in Innaloo, Western Australia. According to a report in The Sydney Morning Herald, the Hereditary preview was accidentally shown to family audiences and created a small panic in the theater. The theater was apparently full of families including "at least 40 children".

The film was released in the United States by A24 on June 8, 2018. It was released in the United Kingdom by Entertainment Film Distributors on June 15, 2018.

Reception

Box office
Hereditary grossed $44.1 million in the United States and Canada, and $38.5 million in other countries, for a total worldwide gross of $82.5 million, against a production budget of $10 million.

In the United States and Canada, Hereditary was released alongside Ocean's 8 and Hotel Artemis, and was originally projected to gross $5–9 million in its opening weekend, similar to the debuts of previous A24 horror films The Witch ($8.8 million in 2016) and It Comes at Night ($6 million in 2017). It was also the widest-ever release for an A24 film with 2,964 theaters, besting the 2,553 of It Comes at Night. After making $5.2 million on its first day, including $1.3 million from Thursday night previews, weekend estimates were increased to $12 million. It went on to debut to $13.6 million, finishing fourth at the box office, behind Ocean's 8, Solo: A Star Wars Story and Deadpool 2, and marking the best-ever opening for an A24 title. In its second weekend the film dropped just 49.5% to $6.9 million (compared to the 60–70% fall many horror films see in their sophomore frame), finishing sixth. On July 29, 2018, the film became A24's highest-grossing film worldwide at $80 million, beating Lady Bird ($78.5 million); it held the record until June 2022 when it was surpassed by Everything Everywhere All at Once.

Critical response

On the review aggregator website Rotten Tomatoes, the film holds an approval rating of 90% based on 383 reviews, and an average rating of 8.3/10. The site's critical consensus reads, "Hereditary uses its classic setup as the framework for a harrowing, uncommonly unsettling horror film whose cold touch lingers long beyond the closing credits." On Metacritic, the film has a weighted average score of 87 out of 100, based on 49 reviews, indicating "universal acclaim".

Writing for Rolling Stone, Peter Travers gave the film 3.5 out of 4 stars and called it the scariest movie of 2018, saying "it's Collette, giving the performance of her career, who takes us inside Annie's breakdown in flesh and spirit and shatters what's left of our nerves. Her tour de force bristles with provocations that for sure will keep you up nights. But first, you'll scream your bloody head off." For The A.V. Club, A.A. Dowd gave the film an A−, stating that, "In its seriousness and hair-raising craftsmanship, Hereditary belongs to a proud genre lineage, a legacy that stretches back to the towering touchstones of American horror, unholy prestige-zeitgeist classics like The Exorcist and Rosemary's Baby. Remarkably, it's a first feature, the auspicious debut of writer-director Ari Aster, whose acclaimed, disturbing short films were all leading, like a tunnel into the underworld, to this bleak vision." Common Sense Media gave the film four out of five stars and advised that it was suitable for viewers aged 17 or older.

Audience reception
Audiences polled by CinemaScore gave the film an average grade of "D+" on an A+ to F scale. Some publications noted the critics-to-audience discrepancy, comparing it to Drive, The Witch and It Comes at Night, all of which were critically acclaimed but failed to impress mainstream moviegoers.

Accolades

References

External links

 
 
 
 
 
 

2010s supernatural horror films
2018 films
2018 horror films
A24 (company) films
American psychological horror films
American supernatural horror films
American horror drama films
Supernatural drama films
Folk horror films
Demons in film
Film controversies in Australia
Advertising and marketing controversies in film
Films about artists
Films about cults
Films about death
Films about dysfunctional families
Films about Spiritism
Films about mental health
Films about spirit possession
Films set in Utah
Films shot in Salt Lake City
Films about witchcraft
Films about grieving
Films about child death
Films directed by Ari Aster
Films scored by Colin Stetson
2010s English-language films
2010s American films
2018 independent films
American independent films
2018 directorial debut films